A by-election was held on 12 June 2009 for the vacant seat of the Assembly of Experts in Tehran Province, caused by death of Mohammad-Hassan Marashi. It was held along with the 2009 Iranian presidential election.

The seat was won by Mahmoud Alavi, who gained more than 2.6 millions out of 5.8 millions of votes cast. He was not supported by major clerical organizations, The Two Societies had endorsed Mohammad-Ali Taskhiri.

Result

References 

Elections in Tehran
2000s in Tehran
By-elections in Iran
2009 elections in Iran